Eospirifer is a genus of extinct brachiopod in the class Rhynchonellata (Articulata) and the order Spiriferida. Their fossils occur most commonly in marine calcareous, microbialitic mudstones with extensive mudcracks or shelly packstones, generally mid-Silurian to early-Devonian in age.

Select species
Eospirifer radiatus
Eospirifer dasifiliformis
Eospirifer lachrymose
Eospirifer praecursor

Silurian brachiopods
Devonian brachiopods
Prehistoric brachiopod genera
Paleozoic brachiopods of Asia
Silurian first appearances
Early Devonian genus extinctions
Fossils of Georgia (U.S. state)
Paleontology in New Hampshire
Paleozoic life of Ontario
Paleozoic life of the Northwest Territories
Paleozoic life of Quebec